Each "article" in this category is a collection of entries about several stamp issuers, presented in alphabetical order. The entries are formulated on the micro model and so provide summary information about all known issuers.  

See the :Category:Compendium of postage stamp issuers page for details of the project.

Hadhramaut 

Refer 	Qu'Aiti State in Hadhramaut

Haiti 

Dates 	1881 –
Capital 	Port-au-Prince
Currency 	100 centimes = 1 gourde

Main Article  Postage stamps and postal history of Haiti

Hamburg 

Dates 	1859–1867
Currency 	16 schillings = 1 mark

Refer 	German States

Hanover 

Dates 	1850–1866
Currency  	(1850) 12 pfennige = 1 gutegroschen; 24 gutengroschen = 1 thaler
		(1858) 10 pfennigs = 1 groschen; 30 groschen = 1 thaler

Refer 	German States

Hatay 

Dates 	1938–1939
Capital 	Alexandretta
Currency 	(1938) 100 centimes = 1 piastre
		(1938) 100 santims = 40 paras = 1 kuru
 
Main article  Postage stamps and postal history of Hatay

Haute Volta 

Refer 	Upper Volta

Hawaii 

Dates 	1851–1898
Capital 	Honolulu
Currency 	100 cents = 1 dollar

Main Article  Postage stamps and postal history of Hawaii

Heilungkiang 

Refer 	Kirin & Heilungkiang

Hejaz 

Dates 	1916–1926
Capital 	Mecca
Currency  	40 paras = 1 piastre

Refer 	Saudi Arabia

See also 	Hejaz-Nejd

Hejaz-Nejd 

Dates 	1926–1932
Capital 	Riyadh
Currency  	(1926) 40 paras = 1 piastre
		(1929) 110 guerche = 10 riyal = 1 gold sovereign

Refer 	Saudi Arabia

See also 	Hejaz

Heligoland 

Dates 	1867–1890
Capital 	
Currency 	(1867) 16 schillings = 1 mark
		(1875) 100 pfennige = 1 mark

Hellas 

Refer 	Greece

Helvetia 

Refer 	Switzerland

Herm 

Refer 	Channel Islands

Herzegovina 

Refer 	Bosnia & Herzegovina

Hoi-Hao (Indochinese Post Office) 

Dates 	1902–1922
Currency 	(1902) 100 centimes = 1 franc
		(1918) 100 cents = 1 piastre

Refer 	China (Indochinese Post Offices)

Holkar 

Refer 	Indore

Holland 

Refer 	Netherlands

Holstein 

Dates 	1864–1867
Capital 	Kiel
Currency 	16 schilling = 1 mark

Refer 	German States

Honduras 

Dates 	1866 –
Capital 	Tegucigalpa
Currency 	(1866) 8 reales = 1 peso
		(1878) 100 centavos = 1 peso
		(1933) 100 centavos = 1 lempira

Main Article  Postage stamps and postal history of Honduras

Hong Kong 

Dates 	1862 –
Capital 	Victoria
Currency 	100 cents = 1 dollar
Main article  Postage stamps and postal history of Hong Kong

Hong Kong (Japanese occupation) 

Dates 	1945 only
Currency 	100 rin = 1 sen; 100 sen = 1 yen

Refer 	Japanese Occupation Issues

Horta 

Dates 	1892–1905
Capital 	
Currency 	1000 reis = 1 milreis

Refer 	Azores Territories

Horthy Regime 

Refer 	Szeged

Hrvatska 

Refer 	Croatia

Hungary 

Dates 	1871 –
Capital 	Budapest
Currency 	(1871) 100 krajczar = 1 forint
		(1900) 100 Fillér (heller) = 1 korona (krone)
		(1926) 100 Fillér = 1 pengo
		(1946) 100 Fillér = 1 forint

Main Article  Postage stamps and postal history of Hungary

See also 	Szeged

Hungary (French occupation) 

Refer 	Arad (French Occupation)

Hungary (Romanian occupation) 

Dates 	1919–1920
Currency  	100 Fillér = 1 korona

Refer 	Romanian Post Abroad

Hungary (Serbian occupation) 

Dates 	1919 only
Currency  	100 Fillér = 1 korona

Refer 	Serbian Occupation Issues

Hyderabad 

Dates 	1869–1948
Currency 	12 pies = 1 anna; 16 annas = 1 rupee

Refer 	Indian Native States

References

Bibliography 
 Stanley Gibbons Ltd, Europe and Colonies 1970, Stanley Gibbons Ltd, 1969
 Stanley Gibbons Ltd, various catalogues
 Stuart Rossiter & John Flower, The Stamp Atlas, W H Smith, 1989
 XLCR Stamp Finder and Collector's Dictionary, Thomas Cliffe Ltd, c.1960

External links 
 AskPhil – Glossary of Stamp Collecting Terms
 Encyclopaedia of Postal History

Had